A Home funeral is when a funeral occurs at a person's home, as opposed to a funeral home. Though rare since the advent of funeral homes, they were once common events, since washing and laying out the body often took place at home, as well as the viewing, the wake and the burial in the family plot. Some are now preferring to do this themselves.

History
Until the American Civil War, most funerals in America were home funerals.

Legality
Most American states allow home funerals, requiring only a death certificate, and legal permission to transport the body. In Canada, the same is required.

From the point of view of the funeral director, in home services present additional challenges; access being prime. Care and sensitivity must be taken particularly in a multi-unit situation such as an apartment, condominium or row housing complex. Families are advised to notify neighbours in advance of services in order to avoid unfortunate misunderstandings. Once delivered into the care of the private home, the funeral director is under no legal obligation to remain with the deceased.

See also
Natural burial
Death midwife

References

External links
 

Funeral Order Of Service - Funeral Stationery Retrieved 28 September 2022

Funerals
Burials